Merci is a 2002 reggae album by the Ivorian artist Alpha Blondy.

Track listing

Personnel
Alpha Blondy – lead vocals

References

2002 albums
Alpha Blondy albums